The Scout and Guide movement in Ecuador is served by
 Asociación Nacional de Guías Scouts del Ecuador, member of the World Association of Girl Guides and Girl Scouts
 Asociación de Scouts del Ecuador, member of the World Organization of the Scout Movement
 Federación Ecuatoriana de Scouts Independientes, prospect member of the World Federation of Independent Scouts

References